Keeley Green is a hamlet located in the Borough of Bedford in Bedfordshire, England.

The settlement is situated directly to the north of the larger village of Wootton .  Keeley Green is also close to the Wood End area of Kempston Rural, as well as the larger town of Kempston.

Hamlets in Bedfordshire
Borough of Bedford